The 1987–88 Yugoslav First League season was the 42nd season of the First Federal League, the top level association football competition of SFR Yugoslavia, since its establishment in 1946. The season began on 2 August 1987 and ended on 12 June 1988. Red Star led by Velibor Vasović won their 16th title with a single points ahead of previous season's champions Partizan.

Teams
A total of eighteen teams contested the league, including sixteen sides from the 1986–87 season and two sides promoted from the 1986–87 Yugoslav Second League (YSL) as winners of the two second level groups East and West. The league was contested in a double round robin format, with each club playing every other club twice, for a total of 34 rounds. Two points were awarded for wins and one point for draws.

Dinamo Vinkovci and Spartak were relegated from the 1986–87 Yugoslav First League after finishing the season in bottom two places of the league table. The two clubs promoted to top level were Vojvodina and Rad.

League table

Results

Winning squad

Top scorers
The top goalscorers in the 1987–88 Yugoslav First League were as follows:

See also
1987–88 Yugoslav Second League
1987–88 Yugoslav Cup
1987–88 NK Dinamo Zagreb season

External links
Yugoslavia Domestic Football Full Tables

Yugoslav First League seasons
Yugo
1987–88 in Yugoslav football